The discography of Archie Roach , an Indigenous (Gunditjmara and Bundjalung) Australian musician consists of 10 studio albums, 3 live album, 1 soundtrack album and 4 compilation albums.

Roach has won numerous awards including and was inducted into the ARIA Hall of Fame in 2020.

Albums

Studio albums

Live albums

Soundtrack albums

Compilation albums

Singles

Other singles

Notes

References

Discographies of Australian artists
Rhythm and blues discographies